Đồng Phú is a rural district (huyện) of Bình Phước province in the Southeast region of Vietnam. As of 2003 the district had a population of 75,573. The district covers an area of 929 km². The district capital lies at Tân Phú.

References

Districts of Bình Phước province